Philippe Charles d'Orléans, petit-fils de France, Duke of Valois (16 July 1664 – 8 December 1666) was a French prince and Grandson of France. He was styled Duke of Valois at the time of his birth. He was a short lived nephew of Louis XIV.

Biography

Born at the Palace of Fontainebleau in July 1664, he known from birth by his father's lesser title of Duke of Valois. His father, Philippe of France, Duke of Orléans, known at court as Monsieur was married to Henrietta of England, daughter of the murdered Charles I of England and the French born Queen Henriette Marie. As such, his parents were first cousins. He had one elder sister, Princess Marie Louise and a younger sister, Princess Anne Marie who was born after his death. 

He received the names of his father, Philippe and his maternal grandfather, Charles.

Philippe Charles birth helped to smooth over the difficult relationship his parents had; his father was a renowned homosexual who was under the domination of his long term lover the "Chevalier de Lorraine". Monsieur complained that Henriette (known simply as Madame) flirted with men at court including the king himself. Court gossip claimed that Philippe Charles' own older sister Marie Louise, was the product of Louis XIV's and Madame's flirting.

After the death of the Queen mother, Anne of Austria in January 1666, Louis XIV promised to raise Philippe Charles with his first cousin le Grand Dauphin. At the end of the year, Philippe Charles himself succumbed and died at the Palais Royal in Paris, the grace and favour residence of his parents. He was buried at the Royal Basilica of Saint Denis, outside Paris.

Ancestors

References and notes

1664 births
1666 deaths
People from Fontainebleau
House of Orléans
House of Bourbon
Dukes of Valois
Courtesy dukes
Princes of France (Bourbon)
17th-century French people
Heirs apparent who never acceded
Royalty and nobility who died as children